Abu Sayed Mohammad Abdul Awal (G), ndc, MDS, psc, BN (born 1957) is a retired Bangladesh Navy Rear Admiral and former Assistant Chief of Naval Staff (Personnel).

Early life

Awal was born in 1957 in Jamalpur District and joined Bangladesh Navy in July 1976 as an Officer Cadet.  He is a member of the pioneer batch on Bangladesh Navy.  He was commissioned as Acting Sub Lieutenant In Bangladesh Navy in January 1979.  In his long naval career he received various training from Turkey, India, UK and US. Awal graduated from Defence Services Command and Staff College and National Defence College, Dhaka, Bangladesh.

Naval commands 

As a successful gunner, Awal commanded almost all kinds of ships and establishments during his long naval service.  He commanded BN frigates BNS Umar Farooq and BNS Ali Haider. He also served as Commodore Commanding BN Flotilla (COMBAN) as staff appointment to command BN fleet. He was appointed as Defence Attaché of Bangladesh Mission to Sri Lanka. Commodore Awal (G), ndc, MDS, psc, BN was promoted to the rank of Rear Admiral on 29 September 2008 and appointed as Assistant Chief of Naval Staff (Operation). He was High Commissioner to the Maldives from August 2010 to January 2015.

Personal life 
Awal married Keya Awal and has one daughter.

See also 
 Military of Bangladesh

References 

Bangladeshi Navy admirals
High Commissioners of Bangladesh to the Maldives
Living people
1957 births